Mama is a monthly women's magazine published in Stockholm, Sweden. Its readers are mostly mothers.

History and profile
Mama was established in 2003. The magazine is part of Bonnier group and is published by Bonnier Tidskrifter AB 13 times a year. The headquarters of the magazine is in Stockholm. It targets mothers and offers articles on fashion, food, travel and interior design. In addition, the magazine publishes the findings of several surveys concerning the lives of mothers in Sweden.

In 2013 the circulation of Mama was 45,600 copies. Its circulation in 2014 was 39,600 copies.

References

External links
Official website

2003 establishments in Sweden
Mama
Magazines established in 2003
Magazines published in Stockholm
Swedish-language magazines
Monthly magazines published in Sweden
Women's magazines published in Sweden